Ali al-Akbar ibn al-Husayn, commonly known as simply Ali al-Akbar, was the son of Al-Husayn ibn Ali, the third  Imam, and Umm Layla. He was martyred at the age of 18 on the day of Ashura, in the Battle of Karbala. According to Jean Calmard writing in Iranica, ‘Ali al-Akbar's reputation as a valiant warrior of the Household of Muhammad might have preceded that of Al-‘Abbas ibn ‘Ali.

Biography 
Ali al-Akbar was born in Medina on 11 Sha'ban 33 AH (10 March 654 CE). His father was Husayn ibn Ali and his mother was Layla bint Abi Murra. He was 18 years old at the battle of Karbala. Two of his brothers were also named Ali al-Asghar ibn Husayn and Ali Zayn al-Abidin. Genealogists and historians considered him the eldest son of Hussein due to the name Akbar. Akbar is an Arabic word that means "greater" or "greatest". The teenager resembled his maternal grandfather Muhammad, the prophet of Allah, so much that Husayn ibn Ali often said, "whenever I happen to miss my maternal grandfather I look at the face of Ali al-Akbar." Ali al-Akbar was killed by Murrah ibn Munqad on 10 Muharram 61 AH in the battle of Karbala.

Battle of Karbala 

Prior to his death, Mu'awiya I, the Umayyad ruler, appointed his son, Yazid I as his successor. This idea was contrary to Islamic principles and the position of the ruler was not the private property of a ruler to grant to his descendants. Yazid ibn Muawiyyah tried to desire religious authority by obtaining the allegiance of Husayn ibn Ali, but Husayn would not give up his principles. After the people of Kufa sent letters to Husayn and asking his help and swearing their allegiance to him, Husayn and his family members ( including Ali al-Akbar ibn Husayn ) and his companions traveled from Mecca to Kufa in Iraq but were forced to camp in the plains of Karbala by Yazid's army of thirty thousands men. Ali al-Akbar was killed and beheaded along with Husayn and his companions in the Battle of Karbala on 10 October 680 (10 Muharram 61 AH) by Yazid's army, then the women and children were taken as prisoners.

Battle and narratives 
As an Iranica said, Ali al-Akbar was one of the last men who was killed in the battle. On the morning of the day of Ashura, Husayn ibn Ali asked Ali Akbar a.s. to call out the Adhan. Husayn ibn Ali and many women in their tents began to weep when Ali Akbar began calling out the Adhan, suspecting that it may be the last time they heard Ali Akbar give the Adhan.

Ali Akbar stood in front of Husayn ibn Ali after Zuhr prayers and said: "Father, I request for your permission to go and fight the enemies of Islam." His father gave him permission and said, "May Allah be with you! But Akbar, you know how much your mother, sisters, and aunts love you. Go and say farewell to them." Ali Akbar went into the tent of his mother, Umm Layla. Every time he wanted to come out of the tent, his mother, aunts, and sisters would pull his cloak and say, "O Akbar, how will we live without you?" Husayn ibn Ali had to plead all to let Ali Akbar go.

Husayn ibn Ali helped his son mount his horse. As Akbar began to ride towards the battlefield he heard footsteps behind him. He looked back and saw his father. He said: "Father, we have said goodbye. Why are you walking behind me?" Husayn ibn Ali replied, "My son, if you had a son like yourself then you would have surely understood!"

According to Bal'ami, Ali Al-Akbar struck the enemies ten times and killed two or three of them each time. Ali Al-Akbar then went back to his father after getting rid of the group of warriors that were ordered to battle against him. Imam Husayn then told Ali Al-Akbar to go to his mother’s tent to see her since she went to pray for him. When  Ali Al-Akbar got there his mother was on the ground unconscious. When he tried to wake her up, she fainted again seeing her son safe in front of her. Before  Ali al-Akbar could wake her up again, he heard his father calling for anyone that could help him and his family to get victory in this tough time. Ali Al-Akbar couldn't handle listening to his father asking for support without standing up and sacrificing his life for him. When  Ali Al-Akbar went to say his last goodbye, he asked his father to check on his mother because he left her unconscious. Umar ibn Sa'ad ordered his soldiers to kill him, saying, "When he dies, Husayn will not want to live! Ali Akbar is the life of Husayn." While a few soldiers attacked Ali Akbar, Murrah ibn Munqad threw a spear through Ali Akbar's chest. Murrah ibn Munqad  then broke the wooden part of the spear and left the blade inside Ali Akbar's chest, to cause him more pain. As Ali Akbar fell from his horse, Yazid’s soldiers then surrounded him and started stabbing him with all kinds of weapons, he then said, "Yaa abata alayka minni salaam". Upon hearing his son's call, it is said that Imam Hussain lost his eyesight. When Imam Hussain arrived close to him and tried to remove the spear from his chest, the spear's head had been tangled in his veins and when Imam Hussain pulled it out, his heart came out alongside it. He was then surrounded and was cut to pieces.

He walked towards the battlefield. When he went to Akbar, Akbar placed his right hand on his wounded chest and his left arm over the shoulder of his father. Al-Husayn asked, "Akbar, why do you embrace me with only one arm?" Akbar did not reply. Al-Husayn tried to move Akbar's right hand, but Akbar resisted. Then Al-Husayn forcefully moved the hand and saw the blade of the spear. He laid Akbar on the ground and sat on his knees, placing both of his hands on the blade of the spear. He looked at Najaf, where his father was buried, and said, "Father, I too have come to my Khaybar!" He pulled out the blade, with it came the heart of Akbar. Al-Husayn, distraught seeing his son in such pain and stress, wept. Akbar sent his last Salam and died.

Burial 
On On 10 October 680 (Muharram 10, 61 AH), the day of Ashura, Ali al-Akbar was killed by Yazid's army. He was the first of the Banu Hashim to go out to the battle-field and be killed. He was buried under husayn's feet. husayn's shrine is hexagonal because Ali al-Akbar's burial ground is located inside of Husayn Shrine.

Impact 
In the Islamic world especially the Shia view, Husayn's suffering and death became a symbol of sacrifice in the struggle for right against wrong, and for justice and truth against injustice and falsehood. The stand of Husayn and his followers as a sacrifice made to prevent the corruption of Islam by tyrannical rulers and to protect its ideas, took became a symbol of resistance inspiring future uprisings against oppressors and injustice. many famous characters, like Nelson Mandela and Mahatma Gandhi, have cited Husayn's stand against oppression as a model for their own fights against injustice.

See also 
 Muhammad the Islamic Nabi (Prophet)  
 ‘Ali ibn Abu Talib
 Battle of Karbala’
 Sakinah(Fatema Kubra) bint Husayn
 Sakina bint Hussain

References

Citations

Sources 

 
 
 
 
 
 
 
 
 

Family of Muhammad
People killed at the Battle of Karbala
664 births
680 deaths